Erythroxylum echinodendron is an extinct in the wild species of plant in the Erythroxylaceae family. It was endemic to Cuba.

References

Sources
IUCN Red List of all Threatened Species

echinodendron
Endemic flora of Cuba
Extinct flora of North America
Plants extinct in the wild
Taxonomy articles created by Polbot